The following is an incomplete list of association football clubs based in the Democratic Republic of the Congo.For a complete list see :Category:Football clubs in the Democratic Republic of the Congo

Clubs

A
AC Sodigraf (Kinshasa)
AC Mbilingos (Kindu)
AC Nkoy (Kindu)
AS Aigle Rouge (Isiro)
AS Bantous (Mbuji-Mayi)
AS Dauphins Noirs (Goma)
AS Dragons (Kinshasa)
AS Kabasha (Goma)
AS Kalamu (Kinshasa)
AS Lokole (Bumba)
AS Mabela a Bana (Mwene-Ditu)
AS Maïka (Uvira)
AS Makinku (Mwene-Ditu)
AS Maniema Union (Kindu)
AS Momekano (Bandundu)
AS Ndoki a Ndombe (Boma)
AS New Soger (Lubumbashi)
AS Nika (Kisangani)
AS Nyuki (Butembo)
AS Paulino (Kinshasa)
AS Saint-Luc (Kananga)
AS Sucrière (Kwilu Ngongo)
AS Veti (Matadi)
AS Vita Club (Kinshasa)
AS Vutuka (Kikwit)

B
Bakolo Mboka (Tshikapa)
Blessing FC

C
CS Don Bosco (Lubumbashi)
CS Imana (Matadi)
CS Makiso (Kisangani)

F
FC Lumière (Mbandaka)
FC Lupopo (Kikwit)
FC Mwangaza (Beni)
FC Renaissance du Congo (Kinshasa)
FC Saint Eloi Lupopo (Lubumbashi)

J
JS Groupe Bazano (Lubumbashi)
JS Kinshasa
JS Likasi (Likasi)

K
KFA (Lubumbashi)

L
Lubumbashi Sport (Lubumbashi)

O
OC Dynamique du Kindu (Kindu)
OC Muungano (Bukavu)
OC Mbongo Sport (Mbuji-Mayi)

R
Racing Club de Kinshasa (Kinshasa)

S
SC Cilu (Lukala)
Shark XI FC (Kinshasa)
SM Sanga Balende (Mbuji-Mayi)

T
TC Elima (Matadi)
TP Mazembe (Lubumbashi)
TP Molunge (Mbandaka)
TS Malekesa (Kisangani)
TV Tshipepele (Kananga)

U
US Bilombe (Bilombe)
US Kenya (Lubumbashi)
US Tshinkunku (Kananga)

 
Democratic Republic of the Congo sport-related lists
Congo, Democratic Republic
Lists of organisations based in the Democratic Republic of the Congo